Günter Kleinen (born 10 January 1941) is a German musicologist and professor of musicology with a focus on music education and systematic musicology as well as music psychology.

Life 
Born in Cologne, Kleinene passed his Abitur in 1960 in Cologne, thenstudied sound engineering between 1960 and 1963 at the Robert Schumann Hochschule Düsseldorf, including violin and piano. In 1963, he began studying musicology, psychology and philosophy at the University of Hamburg. With a dissertation on the subject of Experimentelle Studien zum musikalischen Ausdruck, he was awarded a doctorate in 1967.

From 1968 onwards, Kleinen was a research assistant at the then , at the same time completing a  studies for elementary and secondary schools in music, fine arts and English language and literature, which he completed with the 1st teacher examination. In 1993, 1995 and 1998, he completed guest lectureships lasting several weeks, including at the Chinese Music School in Beijing. In 2003, a lecture tour took him to China, South Korea and Taiwan. In 2019, Kleinen participated in the First International Symposium on the History of Music in the Han and Tan Period in Xi'an, where he was appointed visiting scholar at the local music academy.

For several years, Kleinen served on the board of the professional associations Arbeitskreis für Schulmusik und allgemeine Musikpädagogik (AfS), Arbeitskreis Musikpädagogische Forschung (AMPF) and Deutsche Gesellschaft für Musikpsychologie (DGM). He was co-editor of the yearbook Musikpsychologie (1984 to 2006). In 2016, he completed the research projects Backdoor (Begabung und Kreativität in der populären Musik) and Cream (Vergleichende musikpädagogische Forschung zum guten Musiklehrer). Kleinen is currently engaged in independent musicological research, including current trends in Asian music (China, South Korea, Japan), the integration of Arab musical culture into the music of the European avant-garde and other music pedagogical research methods.

Publications 
 Kleinen, Günter: Experimentelle Studien zum musikalischen Ausdruck. Dissertation, Universität Hamburg, 1968
 Werner Breckoff, Günter Kleinen, Werner Krützfeldt, Werner S. Nicklis, Lutz Rössner, Wolfgang Rogge among others: Musik aktuell: Informationen, Dokumente, Aufgaben; ein Musikbuch für die Sekundar- und Studienstufe. Bärenreiter, Kassel [among others] 1971
 Günter Kleinen: Zur Psychologie musikalischen Verhaltens. Diesterweg, Frankfurt 1975
 Florian Tennstedt und Günter Kleinen: Rockmusik und Gruppenprozesse: Aufstieg und Abstieg der Petards. Fink, Munich 1979
 Günter Kleinen (ed.): Kind und Musik. Laaber, 1984.
 Günter Kleinen: Die psychologische Wirklichkeit der Musik. Wahrnehmung und Deutung im Alltag. Bosse, Kassel 1994.
 Günter Kleinen (ed.): Begabung und Kreativität in der populären Musik. Lit, Münster 2003.
 Günter Kleinen (ed.): Musik und Kind. Chancen für Begabung und Kreativität im Zeitalter der Neuen Medien. Laaber Verlag, Laaber 2003.
Günter Kleinen: Chinesische Musik und der kulturelle Transfer auf der Seidenstraße. Epos, Osnabrück 2011.

Further reading 
 Barbara Barthelmes: Deutsche Gesellschaft für Musikpsychologie. Jahrestagung in Hannover vom 22. bis 24. Februar 1985. In Die Musikforschung. Vol. 38, 1985, .
 Andreas C. Lehmann, Reinhard Kopiez (ed.): 25 Jahre Deutsche Gesellschaft für Musikpsychologie (1983–2008) (IfMpF-Monografie Nr. 19). Hochschule für Musik und Theater, Hannover 2008, .

References

External links 
 
 

German musicologists
1941 births
Living people
People from Cologne
University of Hamburg alumni